is a train station located in Edogawa, Tokyo, Japan.

Lines

Keisei Electric Railway
 Keisei Main Line

Layout
This station consists of two island platforms serving four tracks.

Platforms

History

 1932 - The station begins operation
 17 June 2010 - Station numbering was introduced to all Keisei Line stations; Keisei Koiwa was assigned station number KS11.

References

Railway stations in Japan opened in 1932
Railway stations in Tokyo
Keisei Main Line